Feeling You Up is the second and most recent studio album to date by the American rock band Truly, recorded from 1995 to 1997 and released November 1997 on 12" vinyl and CD.  "It's On Your Face" was used in its entirety in Francis Ford Coppola's TV series First Wave episode 16 "The Undesirables".

Track listing
All songs written by Robert Roth and Truly.
 "(Intro) Public Access Girls" - 4:31
 "Twilight Curtains" - 5:23
 "Wait 'til the Night" - 6:00
 "Air Raid" - 4:49
 "It's On Your Face" - 4:52
 "EM7" - 4:34
 "Come Hither" - 2:57
 "Leatherette Tears" - 4:02
 "The Possessions" - 5:29
 "Repulsion" - 7:14
 "[Untitled]" - 4:36

Personnel
 Hiro Yamamoto - bass, background vocals
 Mark Pickerel - drums, percussion, background vocals
 Robert Roth - vocals, guitar, piano, Hammond organ, Moog synthesizer, mellotron
Also: Sally Barry, Eamon Nordquist

References

1997 albums
Truly albums
Thick Records albums